The Republic of the Congo records in swimming are the fastest ever performances of swimmers from the Republic of the Congo, which are recognised and ratified by the Fédération Congolaise de Natation Amateur (FECONAT).

All records were set in finals unless noted otherwise.

Long Course (50 m)

Men

Women

Short Course (25 m)

Men

Women

References

External links
 FECONAT web site

Republic of the Congo
Records
Swimming
Swimming